Aliabad-e Avval (also Romanized as ‘Alīābād-e Avval; also known as ‘Alīābād and ‘Alīābād-e ‘Olyā) is a village in Gowdin Rural District, in the Central District of Kangavar County, Kermanshah Province, Iran. At the 2006 census, its population was 284, in 69 families.

References 

Populated places in Kangavar County